George Lambert, 1st Viscount Lambert, PC (25 June 1866 – 17 February 1958) was a long-serving British Member of Parliament (MP).

Birth and education

Lambert was born in South Tawton in Devon, on 25 June 1866, the son of George Lambert Gorwyn and his wife, Grace Howard.

George Lambert Gorwyn (1818–1885), who is remembered today as a quarrelsome and much disliked man, had inherited farms in Spreyton and Drewsteignton. He dropped the surname Gorwyn in the 1870s, becoming known merely as George Lambert. His wife, Grace Howard, was the daughter of a farm labourer from South Tawton, who had been his housekeeper. They married in 1866.

Lambert was educated at Spreyton School and North Tawton Grammar School. He left school after his father's death in 1885, and commenced farming.

Political career
Lambert served as a County Councillor for Devonshire, 1889–1912, and as a County Alderman, 1912–1952.

He was first elected as Liberal MP for South Molton at a by-election in 1891.  He was Civil Lord of the Admiralty, 1905–1915, "a post for which he had no obvious qualifications. 'A farmer sent to sea' was a jibe frequently heard in those days" (The Times).  
He lost his seat at the 1924 General Election to the Conservative Cedric Drewe, but regained it at the 1929 general election.  Although he began his parliamentary career as a Liberal, in 1931 Lambert had become a National Liberal supporting the Conservative Party, following a long period criticising David Lloyd George and opposition to the Labour Party.

Lambert was made a Privy Councillor in 1912, and later the same year he was appointed to the Royal Commission on Fuel and Engines. He was created Viscount Lambert when he stepped down as an MP in July 1945, after 48 years, 348 days in the House of Commons, the fifth longest-serving MP of the 20th century.

His eldest son, the Hon. George Lambert, followed him as MP for South Molton, later Torrington, at the 1945 general election, and succeeded him as Viscount Lambert in 1958.

Personal life
Lambert was married on 30 August 1904 to Barbara Stavers, the daughter of George Stavers, a ship-owner of Morpeth, by whom he had two daughters and two sons.

He died, aged 91 years, at his home, "Coffins" in Spreyton on 17 February 1958.

Lambert "was a good shot, and was also fond of a round of golf."

Arms

References

External links
 

Lambert, George Lambert, 1st Viscount
Lambert, George Lambert, 1st Viscount
Lambert, George Lambert, 1st Viscount
Lambert, George Lambert, 1st Viscount
Lambert, George Lambert, 1st Viscount
UK MPs 1886–1892
UK MPs 1892–1895
UK MPs 1895–1900
UK MPs 1900–1906
UK MPs 1906–1910
UK MPs 1910
UK MPs 1910–1918
UK MPs 1918–1922
UK MPs 1922–1923
UK MPs 1923–1924
UK MPs 1929–1931
UK MPs 1931–1935
UK MPs 1935–1945
UK MPs who were granted peerages
Lords of the Admiralty
National Liberal Party (UK, 1931) politicians
Viscounts created by George VI